The 2012 Japan Super Series was the ninth super series tournament of the 2012 BWF Super Series in badminton. The tournament was held in Tokyo, Japan, from 18 to 23 September 2012 and had a total purse of $200,000. Draw was released on 4 September 2012. China withdrew all its players from this tournament because of safety fears.

Men's singles

Seeds

  Lee Chong Wei (champion)
  Peter Gade (first round)
  Simon Santoso (semifinals)
  Sho Sasaki (second round)
  Kenichi Tago (first round)
  Jan Ø. Jørgensen (first round)
  Taufik Hidayat (quarterfinals)
  Nguyen Tien Minh (quarterfinals)

Players by nation

Top half

Bottom half

Finals

Women's singles

Seeds

  Tine Baun (quarterfinals)
  Sung Ji-hyun (semifinals)
  Ratchanok Inthanon (quarterfinals)
  Bae Youn-joo (quarterfinals)
  Tai Tzu-ying (champion)
  Porntip Buranaprasertsuk (semifinals)
  Gu Juan (first round)
  Ai Goto (quarterfinals)

Top half

Bottom half

Finals

Men's doubles
Seeds

  Mathias Boe / Carsten Mogensen (second round)
  Koo Kien Keat / Tan Boon Heong (final)
  Hiroyuki Endo / Kenichi Hayakawa (quarterfinals)
  Hirokatsu Hashimoto / Noriyasu Hirata (quarterfinals)
  Naoki Kawamae / Shoji Sato (quarterfinals)
  Bodin Issara / Maneepong Jongjit (first round)
  Kim Gi-jung / Kim Sa-rang (champion)  Hoon Thien How / Tan Wee Kiong (semifinals)

Top half

Bottom half

Finals

Women's doubles
Seeds

  Mizuki Fujii / Reika Kakiiwa (second round)
  Bao Yixin / Zhong Qianxin (withdrew)  Miyuki Maeda / Satoko Suetsuna (semifinals)
  Shizuka Matsuo / Mami Naito (final)
  Misaki Matsutomo / Ayaka Takahashi (second round)
  Eom Hye-won / Jang Ye-na (quarterfinals)
  Poon Lok Yan / Tse Ying Suet (champion)'  Duanganong Aroonkesorn / Kunchala Voravichitchaikul (quarterfinals)''

Top half

Bottom half

Finals

Mixed doubles

Seeds

  Chan Peng Soon / Goh Liu Ying
  Shintaro Ikeda / Reiko Shiota
  Shoji Sato / Shizuka Matsuo
  Maneepong Jongjit / Savitree Amitrapai
  Muhammad Rijal / Lilyana Natsir
  Songphon Anugritayawon / Kunchala Voravichitchaikul
  Tao Jiaming / Bao Yixin
  Chen Hung-ling / Wu Ti-jung

Top half

Bottom half

Finals

References

External links 

2012 Japan Super Series
Japan Super Series
Japan